Michał Chomentowski  (died 1794) was a Polish military commander and a high-ranking officer of the Polish Army. As the commander of Warsaw's garrison, he took part in the successful Warsaw Uprising (1794). Following the liberation of Warsaw he joined the forces of the Kościuszko's Uprising and commanded the artillery of Józef Zajączek's Corps in the rank of Major. He was killed in the Battle of Chełm of June 8, 1794.

Polish Army officers
1794 deaths
Year of birth unknown